Gemma Gili Giner (born 21 May 1994) is a Spanish footballer who plays as a midfielder for Primera División club Real Sociedad. She previously played for Valencia CF and Barcelona, with whom she has also played in the UEFA Women's Champions League.

As a junior international Gili won the 2010 and 2011 U-17 European Championships, assisting Alba Pomares in the 2011 final's overtime winner. She scored one goal in the 2010 U-17 World Cup against New Zealand.

Honours

Club
 Barcelona
 Primera División (3): 2012–13, 2013–14, 2014–15
 Copa de la Reina (4): 2012–13, 2013–14, 2016–17, 2017–18

International
Spain
 Cyprus Cup: Winner, 2018

References

External links
 
 
 
 Profile at FC Barcelona
 Profile at La Liga 

1994 births
Living people
Spanish women's footballers
FC Barcelona Femení players
Primera División (women) players
Sportspeople from Castellón de la Plana
Footballers from the Valencian Community
Valencia CF Femenino players
Women's association football midfielders
Levante UD Femenino players
Real Sociedad (women) players
Spain women's youth international footballers
21st-century Spanish women